National Bank of Commerce Building may refer to:
 National Bank of Commerce Building (Paragould, Arkansas), listed on the National Register of Historic Places (NRHP)
 National Bank of Commerce Building (Kansas City, Missouri), also NRHP-listed
 One Commerce Square, Memphis, Tennessee, skyscraper built by National Bank of Commerce, also known as "NBC building"

See also
National Bank of Commerce (disambiguation)